HMCS Summerside is a  of the Royal Canadian Navy that has served in the Canadian Forces since 1999. Summerside is the twelfth, and last, ship of her class. She is the second vessel to use the designation . She is assigned to Maritime Forces Atlantic (MARLANT) and is homeported at CFB Halifax.

Design and description
The Kingston class was designed to fill the minesweeper, coastal patrol and reserve training needs of the Canadian Forces, replacing the s, s and Royal Canadian Mounted Police coastal launches in those roles. In order to perform these varied duties the Kingston-class vessels are designed to carry up to three  ISO containers with power hookups on the open deck aft in order to embark mission-specific payloads. The seven module types available for embarkation include four route survey, two mechanical minesweeping and one bottom inspection modules.

The coastal defence vessels are powered by four Jeumont ANR-53-50 alternators coupled to four Wärtsilä UD 23V12 diesel engines creating . Two LIPS Z-drive azimuth thrusters are driven by two Jeumont CI 560L motors creating  and the Z drives can be rotated 360°.

The Kingston class is equipped with a Kelvin Hughes navigational radar using the I band and a Kelvin Hughes 6000 surface search radar scanning the E and F bands. The vessels carry an AN/SQS-511 towed side scan sonar for minesweeping and an AN/WLD-1 RMS Remote Minehunting System (RMHS). The vessels were equipped with one Bofors 40 mm/60 calibre Mk 5C gun and two M2 machine guns. The 40 mm gun was declared obsolete and removed from the vessels in 2014. Some of them ended up as museum pieces and on display at naval reserve installations across Canada. The Kingston-class coastal defence vessels have a complement of 37.

Operational history
Summerside was laid down on 28 March 1998 by Halifax Shipyards Ltd. at Halifax, Nova Scotia and was launched on 25 September 1998. She was commissioned into the Canadian Forces on 18 July 1999 at Summerside, Prince Edward Island and carries the classification MM 711.

In August 2002, Summerside took part in Exercise "Narwhal Ranger", sailing into Arctic waters. This was the first time Canadian naval units had sailed into the Arctic in thirteen years.

As part of Exercise "Tradewinds" which took place from 1–25 June 2014, Summerside took part in and led training of forces from around the Caribbean Sea.

In January 2016, Summerside, alongside sister ship , sailed for the Caribbean to take part in Operation Caribbe. On 7 March, off the coast of Nicaragua, a sailing vessel was intercepted in international waters. The ship returned to Halifax on 7 April. In September  Summerside was among the Canadian warships deployed to the NATO naval training exercise "Cutlass Fury" off the east coast of North America. In February 2017, Summerside and Moncton deployed to the coast of West Africa in the Gulf of Guinea as part of the naval exercise Neptune Trident. The two ships conducted missions against pirates and illegal fishing, along with making port visits to Sierra Leone, Senegal, Liberia and Ivory Coast. During the deployment, Summerside took part in a joint training exercise with naval vessels from Morocco and Senegal. Summerside returned to Halifax on 2 May with Moncton.

On 26 January 2018, Summerside and sister ship  departed Halifax for West Africa to take part in the naval exercise Obangame Express 2018 with the United States Navy and several African navies. Their visit to Nigeria marked the first time Canadian warships have ever visited the country. The vessels returned to Halifax on 17 April. In October 2018, Summerside was among the Canadian ships deployed to the North Atlantic and Baltic Sea as part of the large NATO exercise, Trident Juncture. Summerside and Glace Bay rescued the four crewmembers of Makena with support from US and Canadian aircraft.

In June 2022, Summerside  and Kingston were deployed to Europe in support of NATO following Russia's invasion of Ukraine. During their deployment, they detected naval mines leftover from World War II and safely detonated them. They returned to Halifax in November.

References

Notes

Citations

Sources

External links
 
 HMCS Summerside (MM 711) – official website

Fleet of the Royal Canadian Navy
Kingston-class coastal defence vessels
1998 ships
Ships built in Nova Scotia